The Coupe de Guyane is the top knockout tournament of the French Guiana football.

Winners 
1959/60: AJ Saint-Georges
1960-64   not known
1964/65: AJ Saint-Georges          3-2 Sport Guyanais
1965/66: AJ Saint-Georges
1966-68   not known
1968/69: AJ Saint-Georges
1969/70   not known
1970/71: AJ Saint-Georges
1971/72   not known
1972/73: ASC Roura
1973/74: AS Club Colonial
1974/75: AS Club Colonial
1975/76: Olympique                 2-1 ASC Le Geldar
1976/77   not known
1977/78: AS Club Colonial
1978/79: ASC Le Geldar  (Kourou)   2-1 AJ Saint-Georges
1979/80: AJ Saint-Georges
1980/81   not known
1981/82: AS Club Colonial
1982/83: AJ Saint-Georges
1983/84: AJ Saint-Georges
1984/85: AJ Saint-Georges
1985-89   not known
1989/90: AJ Saint-Georges
1990/91: AS Javouhey Mana
1991/92: AS Javouhey Mana
1992/93: AS Club Colonial
1993/94: AS Club Colonial
1994/95   not known
1995/96: US Sinnamary
1996/97: AS Club Colonial
1997/98: US Sinnamary              bt  AJ Saint-Georges
1998/99: EF Iracoubo               bt  US Sinnamary
1999/00: AJ Saint-Georges
2000/01: AJ Saint-Georges          bt  US Macouria
2001/02: US Sinnamary
2002/03: AJ Saint-Georges
2003/04: AJ Saint-Georges          4-2 Club Colonial               [aet]
2004/05: US Matoury                5-1 Cosma Foot
2005/06: US Macouria              2-1 Cosma Foot
2006/07: ASC Le Geldar    3-1 US Matoury                [aet]
2007/08: Club Sportif et Culturel de Cayenne 4-2 AS Oyapock
2008/09: ASC Le Geldar  3-2 US Macouria
2009/10: ASC Le Geldar 2-0 US Matoury
2010/11: US Matoury 3-2 AJ Saint-Georges
2011/12: US Matoury 1-0 ASC Le Geldar
2012/13: US Matoury 2-2 AJ Saint-Georges                [aet, Matoury on pen]
2013/14: ASC Le Geldar 7-1 ASC Remire
2014/15: US Matoury 2-2 ASC Le Geldar [aet, 5-4 pen]
2015/16: US Matoury 4-3 AS Etoile Matoury
2016/17: not finished
2017/18: AS Etoile Matoury 3-2 ASC Remire                  [aet]
2018/19: AS Etoile Matoury 1-0 ASC Agouado
2019/20: abandoned at the quarter-finals level

External links 
RSSSF: France - D.O.M. - French Guyana - List of Cup Winners

References 

Football competitions in French Guiana
National association football cups
Guin